Nurpur Jattan  is a village in Hoshiarpur district of Punjab State, India. This village comes under mahilpur police station and garhshanker (tehsil). Sabka sarpanch was sartaj singh sangra and now ajit singh Pannu elected as a sarpanch in recent election. This village is administrated by a Sarpanch, who is an elected representative.nurpur jattan has two sikh temples and a religious place which is known as bhagat charn dass ji. A fair held on every year in october in memory of bhagat charan daas ji.
The village comprises an area of 208.54 hectares.

Demography 
According to the report published by Census India in 2011, Nurpur Jattan has total number of 157 houses and population of 763 of which include 401 males and 362 females. 568 persons were counted as literate, representing a literacy rate of 74.4%, slightly below the state average of 75.84%. The population of children under the age of 6 years is 55 (32 males and 23 females), which is 7.21% of total population of Nurpur Jattan.

Population data

Air travel connectivity 
The closest airport to the village is Sri Guru Ram Dass Jee International Airport.

Villages in Kapurthala

References

External links
 Kapurthala Villages List

Villages in Kapurthala district